Kirk Hanna Park is a park in Hanover, Colorado, a rural district south-east of Colorado Springs.  This park was the first project undertaken by the Hanover Community Park Board, formed in 1999.

References

Parks in Colorado
Protected areas of El Paso County, Colorado